Ben Joseph Hayes (born August 4, 1957) is a former relief pitcher who played for the Cincinnati Reds both in 1982 and 1983.

After his playing career ended, Hayes earned a law degree from the University of Florida.  Hayes currently practices law in Florida and serves as President of the New York–Penn League.

References

Ben Hayes played for Weisbaden Little League 1in 1970 LLWS

External links

1957 births
Living people
Cincinnati Reds players
Tampa Tarpons (1957–1987) players
Billings Mustangs players
Indianapolis Indians players
Greensboro Hornets players
Waterbury Reds players
Arkansas Travelers players
Louisville Redbirds players
South Florida Bulls baseball players
Major League Baseball pitchers
Baseball players from New York (state)
New York–Penn League